NX Files (NX Files: Discover the Secret) is an action martial arts multi-season video series broadcast online. Created by Robert Baldwin, John Purchase, Alain Moussi and Stephan Roy; the webisodes are filmed and produced in Orleans, Ontario, Canada. NX Files chronicles the out-of-this-world adventures of Team Xtreme, a group of young martial artists. A source of power called the NX Secret gives each member of Team Xtreme a unique special ability. They must fight to protect this secret from a band of ninjas and an evil dark lord.

Show summary 

Team Xtreme consists of 7 members, black belt instructors. After discovering the NX Secret, each member developed super powers such as speed, ability, and strength.

The villains in NX Files are a ruthless band of evil ninjas known as the Kurai Kai. Led by Lord Tragos, a former member of Team Xtreme, the Kurai Kai attempts to steal the NX Secret from Team Xtreme.

Aside from ninjas, Team Xtreme must also deal with advanced beings known as Archons and vicious animal-like creatures called Hybrids.

Season 1

In Season 1, Team Xtreme was introduced to the world. The seven young members must use their martial arts skills and their special super abilities to fend against a mysterious band of ninjas called the Kurai Kai. It is soon revealed to the Team that the leader of the Kurai Kai, a mysterious dark figure known as Lord Tragos is in fact their dear old friend Tornado, who has been corrupted and transformed by the evil powers of Mugen Kurai. Lord Tragos' ultimate plan is to steal the NX Secret from Team Xtreme in order to quench his own thirst for power.

Season 2

In Season 2, Team Xtreme takes a step into a larger world. The conflict between them and Kurai kai suddenly seems tiny in comparison to what is happening beyond. When the Archon Mr. Black tells Spike of a new threat called the Hybrids, he entrusts him with a quest to find the only weapon capable of destroying them. In the meantime however, the Hybrid leader Golock travels to the lair of the Kurai Kai and enlists a reborn Lord Tragos to help him find the weapon first.

See also 

Characters of NX Files

References 

 
 
 Text of the CTV televised cast can be found on the CTV website: CTV Article about NX Files "Internet Movies"

External links 
 
 

2005 web series debuts
Martial arts films
Video podcasts
Canadian drama web series